The 1979 South American Rugby Championship was the eleventh edition of the competition of the leading national Rugby Union teams in South America.

The tournament was played in Chile and won by Argentina.

Standings 

{| class="wikitable"
|-
!width=165|Team
!width=40|Played
!width=40|Won
!width=40|Drawn
!width=40|Lost
!width=40|For
!width=40|Against
!width=40|Difference
!width=40|Pts
|- bgcolor=#ccffcc align=center
|align=left| 
|4||4||0||0||238||47|||+ 191||8
|- align=center
|align=left| 
|4||2||1||1||126||37||+ 89||5
|- align=center
|align=left| 
|4||2||1||1||104||62||+ 42||5
|- align=center
|align=left| 
|4||1||0||3||25||216||- 191||2
|- align=center
|align=left| 
|4||0||0||4||41||172||- 131||0
|}

Results 
 
First round

Second round

Third round

Fourth round

Fifth round

References

 IRB – South American Championship 1979

Notes

1979
1979 rugby union tournaments for national teams
1979 in Argentine rugby union
rugby union
rugby union
rugby union
rugby union
International rugby union competitions hosted by Chile